Carol Spier is a Canadian production designer and art director. Much of her work has been on David Cronenberg films.

Recognition 
 1980 Genie Award for Best Achievement in Art Direction/Production Design - The Brood - Nominated
 1982 Genie Award for Best Achievement in Art Direction - Scanners - Nominated
 1984 Genie Award for Best Achievement in Art Direction - Videodrome - Nominated
 1986 Gemini Award for Best Production Design or Art Direction - Anne of Green Gables - Won
 1989 Genie Award for Best Achievement in Art Direction/Production Design - Dead Ringers - Won
 1992 Genie Award for Best Achievement in Art Direction/Production Design - Naked Lunch - Won
 2000 Genie Award for Best Achievement in Art Direction/Production Design - eXistenZ - Won (shared with Elinor Rose Galbraith)
 2006 DGC Craft Award for Outstanding Production Design - Feature Film - A History of Violence - Nominated
 2007 Genie Award for Best Achievement in Art Direction/Production Design - Eastern Promises - Nominee
 2015 DGC Craft Award for Outstanding Production Design - Feature Film - Maps to the Stars - Pending

References

External links 
 

Canadian art directors
Canadian production designers
Year of birth missing (living people)
Living people
Best Art Direction/Production Design Genie and Canadian Screen Award winners
Canadian women in film